Iceland University of the Arts is an Icelandic institution of higher art education, located in Reykjavík, which offers the only university-level degrees in the arts in Iceland. The institution was founded on 21 September 1998 by consolidating the Iceland Drama School and the Reykjavík Arts School, and classes began in autumn 1999.

Education 
Following the standards of the Bologna process, IUA offers bachelor's degree programmes (3 years, 180 ECTS credits, Bachelor of Fine Arts), and master's degree programmes (2 years, 120 ECTS credits, Master of Fine Arts).  

There are seven study programmes available at IUA: 

 Architecture
 Arts Education 
 Design
 Film
 Fine Art
 Music
 Performing Arts

Notable alumni & faculty
Faculty members of IUA are all practising artists and experts in their field of work. Distinguished former students and faculty members at IUA include:

Fine Art: Bryndís H. Snæbjörnsdóttir, Carl Boutard, Egill Sæbjörnsson, Elín Hansdóttir, Hekla Dögg Jónsdóttir, Hrafnhildur Arnardóttir (Shoplifter), Hugleikur Dagsson, Ólöf Nordal, Ragnar Kjartansson, Sigurður Guðjónsson, Monika Larsen Dennis.

Music: Atli Ingólfsson, composer. Bára Gísladóttir, composer and musician. Guðmundur Steinn Gunnarsson, composer and musician. Hildur Guðnadóttir, composer and musician. Ólöf Arnalds, singer/songwriter and musician.

Performing Arts: Baltasar Kormákur, director and actor. Ebba Katrín Finnsdóttir, actress. Halldóra Geirharðsdóttir, actress and musician. Hannes Óli Ágústsson, actor. Karl Ágúst Þorbergsson device theatre. Katrín Gunnarsdóttir, dancer and choreographer. Kristín Þóra Haraldsdóttir, actress. Matthías Haraldsson, vocalist of Hatari & playwright. Ólafur Darri Ólafsson, actor. Sigríður Soffía Níelsdóttir, dancer and choreographer. Stefán Karl Stefánsson, film and stage actor. Þorleifur Örn Arnarson, theatre director and playwright.

See also
 Skemman.is (digital library)

References

External links
 Official homepage, English version
 Listing at Cumulus, International Association of Universities and Colleges of Art, Design and Media
 Listing and ranking at 4 International Colleges and Universities
 Listing at www.University.Directory.eu
 Arts Schools in Iceland, list at Center for Icelandic Art

Universities in Iceland
Music schools in Iceland
Educational institutions established in 1998
1998 establishments in Iceland